Susan Cawthon Bucklew (born May 12, 1942) is an American lawyer, jurist, and former school teacher. She is a senior United States district judge of the United States District Court for the Middle District of Florida.

Education and career

Born in Tampa, Florida, Bucklew  received her Bachelor of Arts degree from Florida State University in 1963, her Master of Arts from the University of South Florida in 1968, and her Juris Doctor from the Stetson University College of Law in 1977.

Before becoming a lawyer, she was teacher and taught at Henry B. Plant High School from 1964 to 1965 and again from 1970 to 1972. She also taught at Seminole High School from 1965 to 1967, George D. Chamberlain High School in 1969, and Hillsborough Community College from 1974 to 1975.

She was corporate legal counsel for the Jim Walter Corporation from 1978 to 1982, then served as a county judge in Hillsborough County Court from 1982 to 1986, and as a circuit judge of the Thirteenth Judicial Circuit of Florida from 1986 to 1993. She served as Director of Cawthon Oil Company.

Federal judicial service

President Bill Clinton nominated Bucklew to the United States District Court for the Middle District of Florida to the seat vacated by William J. Castagna on October 29, 1993. Confirmed by the Senate on November 20, 1993, and received commission four days later. Bucklew assumed senior status on August 1, 2008.

See also
HeightMax (2006-2007)

References

External links
 

1942 births
Living people
Florida State University alumni
Judges of the United States District Court for the Middle District of Florida
United States district court judges appointed by Bill Clinton
People from Tampa, Florida
Stetson University College of Law alumni
Florida state court judges
Educators from Florida
20th-century American judges
21st-century American judges
20th-century American women judges
21st-century American women judges